The E (Eastern) postcode area, also known as the London E postcode area, is the part of the London post town covering much of east London, England. It borders the N postcode area to the west, both north of the tidal Thames. Since closure of the East London mail centre its mail is sorted at Romford Mail Centre together with IG and RM postcode areas.

Postal administration
The current E postcode area was originally formed in 1866 as a merger of the E and NE areas, which had been created in 1858. In 1917, the postal districts were numbered alphabetically by their most important parish, chapelry, topographical or built environment feature. As of 2004, the district names do not form part of the postal address. High demand caused sector 9 of the E1 postcode district to be split and recoded in 1999 to create an E1W postcode district around Wapping, but the rest of the district did not gain an additional character. When districts are used for purposes other than the sorting of mail, such as use as a geographic reference and on street signs, E1 and E1W continue to be commonly classed as one 'district'. The E postcode area contains two non-geographic postcode districts for high-volume business users, E77 and E98.

The Eastern District Office is on Whitechapel Road and was the eastern terminus for the former London Post Office Railway, which has been mothballed since 2003. The railway ran  to the Paddington Head District Sorting Office.

The E20 postcode has been used fictionally in television soap-opera EastEnders since 1985. It has been a real postcode since 2011 carved from and only bordered by the E15 postcode, its buildings marketed as and often self-identifying as Olympic Park and Queen Elizabeth Park.  It includes landmark sports venues built for the 2012 Summer Olympics.

List of postcode districts
The approximate coverage of the postcode districts, with the historic postal district names in italics, is as follows:

 
|-
! E1
| LONDON
| Eastern head district: Aldgate (part), Bishopsgate (part), Whitechapel, Shoreditch (part), Spitalfields, Shadwell, Limehouse, Stepney, Mile End (part), Portsoken
| Tower Hamlets, Hackney, City of London
|-
! E1W
| LONDON
| Wapping district: Wapping, St Katharine Docks, Stepney (part), Shadwell (part), Whitechapel (part)
| Tower Hamlets
|-
! E2
| LONDON
| Bethnal Green district: Bethnal Green, Haggerston, Hoxton (part), Shoreditch (part), Cambridge Heath, Globe Town
| Tower Hamlets, Hackney
|-
! E3
| LONDON
| Bow district: Bow, Bow Common, Bromley-by-Bow, Old Ford, Mile End (part), Fish Island, Hackney Wick (part), South Bromley, Mill Meads (part)
| Tower Hamlets, Newham
|-
! E4
| LONDON
| Chingford district: Chingford, Waltham Abbey (part), Highams Park, Woodford Green (part)
| Waltham Forest, Epping Forest
|-
! E5
| LONDON
| Clapton district: Leyton (Part), Upper Clapton, Lower Clapton, Stoke Newington (part)
|Hackney, Waltham Forest
|-
! E6
| LONDON
| East Ham district: East Ham, Beckton, Upton Park (part), Barking (part)
| Newham, Barking and Dagenham
|-
! E7
| LONDON
| Forest Gate district: Forest Gate, Leytonstone (Part), Stratford (part)
| Newham, Waltham Forest
|-
! E8
| LONDON
| Hackney district: Hackney Central, Dalston, London Fields, Stoke Newington (part)
| Hackney
|-
! E9
| LONDON
| Homerton district: Homerton, Hackney Wick, South Hackney, Hackney Marshes, Victoria Park
| Hackney, Tower Hamlets
|-
! E10
| LONDON
| Leyton district: Leyton, Temple Mills, Hackney Marshes (part) Upper Clapton (part), Walthamstow Marshes
| Waltham Forest, Hackney
|-
! E11
| LONDON
| Leytonstone district: Leytonstone, Wanstead, Aldersbrook (part), Snaresbrook, Cann Hall
| Waltham Forest, Redbridge
|-
! E12
| LONDON
| Manor Park district: Manor Park, Little Ilford, Aldersbrook (part)
| Newham, Redbridge
|-
! E13
| LONDON
| Plaistow district: Plaistow, West Ham (part), Upton Park (part)
| Newham
|-
! E14
| LONDON
| Poplar district: Poplar, Isle of Dogs, Limehouse, Canary Wharf, Millwall, Blackwall, Cubitt Town, South Bromley, North Greenwich, Leamouth
| Tower Hamlets
|-
! E15
| LONDON
| Stratford district: Stratford, West Ham (part), Maryland, Leyton (part), Leytonstone (part) Temple Mills (part), Hackney Wick (part), Bow (part)
| Newham, Waltham Forest, Hackney, Tower Hamlets
|-
! E16
| LONDON
| Victoria Docks and North Woolwich district: Canning Town, Silvertown, Royal Docks, North Woolwich, Beckton (part), Custom House, London City Airport
| Newham
|-
! E17
| LONDON
| Walthamstow district: Walthamstow, Upper Walthamstow, Leyton (part)

| Waltham Forest
|-
! E18
| LONDON
| Woodford and South Woodford district: Woodford, South Woodford
| Redbridge
|-
! E20
| LONDON
| Olympic Park district: Olympic Park, & parts of Stratford, Homerton, Leyton, Bow
| Newham, Waltham Forest, Hackney, Tower Hamlets
|-
! E77
| LONDON
| Non-geographic postcode district (NatWest, delivers to E1)
| Tower Hamlets
|-
! E98
| LONDON
| Non-geographic postcode district (News International, delivers to E1W)
| Tower Hamlets 
|}
The E17 postcode district is one of four to have a population above 100,000.

Boundaries
The E1 postcode district is bounded by the River Thames to the south. Postcode districts E6, E14 and E16 also have river frontages in the south. The River Roding and the North Circular Road form part of the boundary in the east. The postcode area is roughly the combined area of the London Boroughs of Tower Hamlets, Newham and Waltham Forest. Also, the eastern part of the London Borough of Hackney, the western sections of the London Boroughs of Redbridge (E11, E12, E18) and Barking and Dagenham (E6) and a small part of the Epping Forest District (E4), are within the postcode area.

In popular culture
 The 1990s pop band East 17, formed in Walthamstow, whose postcode district is E17.
 BBC soap EastEnders used the then-fictional post code E20 as the post code for the borough of Walford.
 The track "Bow E3" by grime musician Wiley refers to the E3 postcode, which is centred on the area of Bow where Wiley grew up.

Map

The postcode area excludes parts of East London like the following:
 Central areas covered by central London EC postcodes.
 Hoxton in Shoreditch is part of the N postcode area but is usually seen as being part of the East End.
 The eastern suburbs built after the introduction of the E postcode area are now mainly in the IG and RM postal areas.

See also

Postcode Address File
List of postcode areas in the United Kingdom
London postal district
North East (London sub region)

References

External links
Royal Mail's Postcode Address File
A quick introduction to Royal Mail's Postcode Address File (PAF)

Media and communications in the London Borough of Hackney
Media and communications in the London Borough of Newham
Media and communications in the London Borough of Redbridge
Media and communications in the City of London
Media and communications in the London Borough of Tower Hamlets
Media and communications in the London Borough of Waltham Forest
Postcode areas covering London
Postcode areas covering the East of England